Jason Kenneth Pulliam (born 1971) is a United States district judge of the United States District Court for the Western District of Texas.

Education 

Pulliam received a Bachelor of Arts, cum laude, and a Master of Arts from Brooklyn College. He received his Juris Doctor, cum laude, from the Thurgood Marshall School of Law at Texas Southern University.

Career 

Pulliam served in the United States Marine Corps and was a Judge Advocate from 2000 to 2004.

From 2017 to 2019, Pulliam was of counsel with Prichard Young, where his practice focused on complex civil litigation matters.

Judicial career 

Pulliam served as a Justice on Texas' Fourth Court of Appeals after being appointed to the court by Governor Rick Perry on January 8, 2015. His term ended on December 31, 2016. He also previously served as a judge for the Bexar County Court at Law, handling both civil and criminal matters.

Federal judicial service 

On March 1, 2019, President Donald Trump announced his intent to nominate Pulliam to serve as a United States district judge for the United States District Court for the Western District of Texas. On March 5, 2019, his nomination was sent to the Senate. President Trump nominated Pulliam to the seat vacated by Sam Sparks, who assumed senior status on December 31, 2017. On June 20, 2019, his nomination was reported out of committee by a 12–10 vote. On July 30, 2019, the Senate voted 54–34 to invoke cloture on his nomination. On July 31, 2019, his nomination was confirmed by a 54–36 vote. He received his judicial commission on August 5, 2019.

See also 
 List of African-American federal judges
 List of African-American jurists
 List of first minority male lawyers and judges in Texas

References

External links 
 
 

|-

1971 births
Living people
20th-century American lawyers
21st-century American judges
African-American judges
African-American lawyers
Brooklyn College alumni
Judges of the United States District Court for the Western District of Texas
People from Brooklyn
Texas lawyers
Texas state court judges
Thurgood Marshall School of Law alumni
United States district court judges appointed by Donald Trump